is a town located in Fuwa District, Gifu Prefecture, Japan. , the town had an estimated population of 27,439 and a population density of 480 persons per km2, in 10,525 households.

Geography
Tarui is located in far southwestern Gifu Prefecture, at the western end of the Nōbi Plain of Japan. The town has a climate characterized by hot and humid summers, and mild winters (Köppen climate classification Cfa). The average annual temperature in Tarui is 15.0 °C. The average annual rainfall is 1904 mm with September as the wettest month. The temperatures are highest on average in August, at around 27.5 °C, and lowest in January, at around 3.7 °C.

Neighbouring municipalities
Gifu Prefecture
Ōgaki
Ikeda
Ibigawa
Sekigahara
Yōrō

Demographics
Per Japanese census data, the population of Tarui peaked around the year 2000 and has declined slightly since.

History
The area around Tarui was part of traditional Mino Province. Numerous Jōmon period and Kofun period remains have been found in the area, which was the site of the Nara period provincial capital and Provincial temple. During the Edo period, Tarui-juku prospered as a post station on the Nakasendō highway connecting Edo with Kyoto. The town of Tarui was formed on 1 July 1889 with the establishment of the modern municipalities system. The 1891 Mino–Owari earthquake caused considerable damage to the area. Tarui annexed the neighboring villages of Iwate, Fuchu, Miyashiro, Osa, and Aihara in 1954. The 1959 Isewan Typhoon caused severe damage to the town.

Education
Tarui has seven public elementary schools and two public middle schools operated by the town government, and one public high school operated by the Gifu Prefectural Board of Education.

Transportation

Railway
 JR Central - Tōkaidō Main Line

Highway

Sister city relations
 - Calgary, Alberta, Canada, from July 1996

Local attractions
Nangū Taisha, the ichinomiya of Mino Province
Tarui Ichirizuka. a National Historic Site
Mino Provincial Capital Site, A National Historic Site
The Beauty of Tarui, a video portraying the major sites of Tarui

References

External links

 

 
Towns in Gifu Prefecture